Tisdale was a provincial electoral district  for the Legislative Assembly of the province of Saskatchewan, Canada, centered on the town of Tisdale, Saskatchewan. Created before the 4th Saskatchewan general election in 1917, this riding was dissolved and combined with the Melfort district (as Melfort-Tisdale) before the 12th Saskatchewan general election in 1952.

It is now part of the constituencies of Melfort and Carrot River Valley.

Another provincial electoral district in the same area called "Kelsey-Tisdale" existed from 1975 to 1995.

Members of the Legislative Assembly

Election results

|-

 
|Conservative
|Robert McLean
|align="right"|450
|align="right"|45.92%
|align="right"|–
|- bgcolor="white"
!align="left" colspan=3|Total
!align="right"|980
!align="right"|100.00%
!align="right"|

|-

|Independent
|James Hugh McPhail
|align="right"|1,108
|align="right"|45.75%
|align="right"|–
|- bgcolor="white"
!align="left" colspan=3|Total
!align="right"|2,422
!align="right"|100.00%
!align="right"|

|-
 
|style="width: 130px"|Conservative
|Walter C. Buckle
|align="right"|1,349
|align="right"|48.09%
|align="right"|-

|- bgcolor="white"
!align="left" colspan=3|Total
!align="right"|2,805
!align="right"|100.00%
!align="right"|

|-
 
|style="width: 130px"|Conservative
|Walter C. Buckle
|align="right"|2,939
|align="right"|60.18%
|align="right"|+12.09

|- bgcolor="white"
!align="left" colspan=3|Total
!align="right"|4,884
!align="right"|100.00%
!align="right"|

|-
 
|style="width: 130px"|Conservative
|Walter C. Buckle
|align="right"|Acclaimed
|align="right"|100.00%
|- bgcolor="white"
!align="left" colspan=3|Total
!align="right"|Acclamation
!align="right"|

|-

 
|Conservative
|Walter C. Buckle
|align="right"|2,407
|align="right"|29.46%
|align="right"|-

|Farmer-Labour
|Jay B. Ennis
|align="right"|2,338
|align="right"|28.62%
|align="right"|-
|- bgcolor="white"
!align="left" colspan=3|Total
!align="right"|8,170
!align="right"|100.00%
!align="right"|

|-
 
|style="width: 130px"|CCF
|John H. Brockelbank
|align="right"|4,202
|align="right"|44.74%
|align="right"|+16.12

 
|Conservative
|Garth F. Johnston
|align="right"|654
|align="right"|6.96%
|align="right"|-22.50
|- bgcolor="white"
!align="left" colspan=3|Total
!align="right"|9,392
!align="right"|100.00%
!align="right"|

|-
 
|style="width: 130px"|CCF
|John H. Brockelbank
|align="right"|5,283
|align="right"|64.00%
|align="right"|+19.26

 
|Prog. Conservative
|Isaac F. Stothers
|align="right"|703
|align="right"|8.51%
|align="right"|+1.55
|- bgcolor="white"
!align="left" colspan=3|Total
!align="right"|8,255
!align="right"|100.00%
!align="right"|

|-
 
|style="width: 130px"|CCF
|John H. Brockelbank
|align="right"|5,242
|align="right"|50.44%
|align="right"|-13.56

 
|Prog. Conservative
|William L. Hayes
|align="right"|1,171
|align="right"|11.27%
|align="right"|+2.76
|- bgcolor="white"
!align="left" colspan=3|Total
!align="right"|10,393
!align="right"|100.00%
!align="right"|

See also 
Electoral district (Canada)
List of Saskatchewan provincial electoral districts
List of Saskatchewan general elections
List of political parties in Saskatchewan
Tisdale, Saskatchewan

References 
 Saskatchewan Archives Board – Saskatchewan Election Results By Electoral Division

Former provincial electoral districts of Saskatchewan